Shri Shiva Chhatrapatichi 91 Kalmi Bakhar, better known as 91-Kalami Bakhar, is a Marathi language biography of Shivaji, the founder of the Maratha Empire. Organized into 91 sections, it is an important source of information about Shivaji's life for modern historians. The original text was composed by Shivaji's courtier Dattaji Trimal, but is now lost: its extracts survive in later recensions. Although the original text was the earliest bakhar about Shivaji's life, the interpolations in these recensions have rendered the surviving text unreliable.

Original text 

Internal evidence suggests that the original text was written before 1713, probably as early as before 1685.

Later recensions 

The original text written by Dattaji is now largely lost, although some extracts from it are available in several later recensions. These recensions survive in form of six manuscripts, and despite the text's title, some of them contain 96 sections. These contents of these recensions vary, and are sometimes mutually contradictory.

The earliest surviving manuscript of the text was made by Khando Annaji Malkare, probably during 1720–1740. It contain several interpolations, and includes legends with supernatural elements. Much of the text in this recension is about Khando's father Anaji Malkare, and these interpolations have rendered it unreliable.

Modern editions 

During British Raj, multiple modern scholars published various recensions of the text:

 V. K. Rajwade in 
 Kashinath Narayan Sane in 
 D. B. Parasnis in 

In 1806, Lt. E. J. Frissell translated the Raigad manuscript of the  into English; this translation was published in George Forrest's Selections from Bombay State Papers. In 1907, Jadunath Sarkar published another English translation in Modern Review. In 1930, V. S. Wakaskar republished the earlier editions in one place.

References 

Shivaji
17th-century Indian books
18th-century Indian books
Bakhars
Biographies about royalty